Nandur Pathar is a village in Parner taluka in Ahmednagar district of state of Maharashtra, India.

Religion
Though the majority religion is Hindu, all minority class live together with brotherhood, celebrates and participates in all festivals and fairs equally.

Economy
The majority of the population has farming as their primary occupation.

See also
 Parner taluka
 Villages in Parner taluka

References

Villages in Parner taluka
Villages in Ahmednagar district